CIMM is an acronym that can stand for:
 Capability Immaturity Model (CIMM), which contrast to the Capability Maturity Model (CMM)
 Canadian Institute of Mining, Metallurgy and Petroleum
 The Coalition for Innovative Media Measurement
 Committee on Citizenship and Immigration, a Canadian review panel dealing with immigration
 Mining and Metallurgy Research Center (Centro de Investigación Minera y Metalúrgica), a Chilean research intuition.